Est'd 1969 is the twenty-fourth studio album by Steeleye Span, released on 28 June 2019.

Track listing
 "Harvest" (Steeleye Span) – 7:29
 "Old Matron" (Steeleye Span) – 5:00
 "The January Man" (Dave Goulder) – 4:47
 "The Boy and the Mantle (Three Tests of Chastity)" (Traditional) – 6:29
 "Mackerel of the Sea" (Traditional) – 6:39
 "Cruel Ship’s Carpenter" (Traditional) – 6:23
 "Domestic" (Traditional) – 6:28
 "Roadways" (music: Steeleye Span; lyrics: John Masefield) – 5:02
 "Reclaimed" (Rose Kemp) – 3:12

Personnel
Steeleye Span
 Maddy Prior – vocals
 Liam Genockey – drums, percussion
 Julian Littman – guitar, mandolin, keyboards, vocals
 Jessica May Smart – violin, vocals
 Andrew "Spud" Sinclair – guitar, vocals
 Benji Kirkpatrick – bouzouki, guitar, mandolin, banjo, vocals
 Roger Carey – bass, vocals

Additional personnel
 Ian Anderson – flute on "Old Matron"
 Sophie Yates – harpsichord on "The Boy and the Mantle"

References

2019 albums
Steeleye Span albums